Colleen Marie Applegate, known professionally as
Shauna Grant (May 30, 1963 – March 23, 1984), was an American pornographic actress and nude model. She ran away from her small town in Minnesota and proceeded to appear in over 30 pornographic films, earning up to $100,000 in her two-year career. Grant died by suicide after the arrest of her partner in March 1984. She was inducted into the XRCO Hall of Fame in 1999. She was sometimes credited as Callie Aimes, Callie Aims, or Colleen Applegate.

Early life 
Colleen Applegate was born in Bellflower, California. Her family moved to the small town of Farmington, Minnesota in 1973 when her father, Philip Applegate, took a managerial position with the Central Telephone Company of Minnesota. Colleen graduated from Farmington High School in 1981, where she had been a cheerleader. She stayed in the town, working first as a cashier and then as a repair clerk with the phone company.

Applegate attempted suicide in December, 1981 by overdosing on prescription sinus pills. Her father later said he never discussed the suicide attempt with his daughter; he and his wife at the time (Colleen's mother, Karen Lee Applegate) believed their daughter was merely seeking attention. According to a PBS Frontline documentary, the entire Applegate family had at least one group session at a counseling center during which no one really talked about the situation.

After news spread around Farmington about her suicide attempt, Applegate left town with her boyfriend, Mike Marcell, and moved to California in March, 1982.

Adult film career 
After arriving in Los Angeles, Applegate and Marcell unsuccessfully pursued several employment leads. Marcell then saw an ad for the World Modeling Agency in Van Nuys, which sought recruits for "figure modeling". Accompanied by Marcell, Applegate visited the agency's owner, Jim South, who set up a photo session with legendary soft-core photographer J. Stephen Hicks. (Hicks' work was frequently featured in Penthouse.)

Her first pictorial's theme featured a mock camping set and was published by Club. Hicks reflected on Applegate's appearance and personality, saying: "I deal with a lot of girls who are new in the business, a lot of young girls and a lot of girls from out of town. Colleen was so incredibly young and naive. She was completely un-hip and non-L.A."

Her wholesome, "girl next door" looks soon landed her work posing for other magazines such as Chic, Hustler, Swank, and Penthouse. But Hicks advised Applegate to get out of nude modeling quickly, because when all of the magazines had used her, the only thing left for her would be hardcore movies. "You know, you take a typical girl that's used to working at McDonald's or at a shoe store, where she's used to making a minimum wage, and suddenly she's given the opportunity to get made up, and be in front of people who tell her she's beautiful, and make as much money in a day as she was making in three weeks and, um, they change. They change. And that's sad."

Almost immediately, Applegate progressed to filming hardcore photo sessions for well-known photographer Suze Randall.

Applegate's relationship with her boyfriend ended within their first two months in California; Marcell left her to return to Farmington, Minnesota and ultimately joined the U.S. Army. Before his induction, he informed some residents of her small town that Applegate was involved with pornography, which caused her family much embarrassment. In the Frontline documentary, Marcell refused to speak about his relationship with Applegate, except to say that he no longer cared about her.

Ignoring Hicks' advice, Applegate continued working with World Modeling Agency, where she met veteran porn producer Bobby Hollander. Hollander launched her adult film career, suggesting what he felt was a "classy" stage name, Shauna Grant.

As a fast-rising adult entertainment personality, she was featured in Virginia, Suzie Superstar, and Flesh and Laces 1 & 2, among many other films. Her pay rose from $300 a day to around $1,500. As Shauna Grant, she made dozens of popular adult movies, usually plot-oriented. In Suzie Superstar, she played the lead singer of a rock band.

Grant was provided with her own make-up artist, 27-year-old Laurie Smith (who was also an adult star). Smith, who co-starred with Grant in several movies (including Suzie Superstar, The Young Like It Hot, and Bad Girls IV), also became Grant's best friend and fellow cocaine user during that period. She quit the adult film business for a short time following Grant's suicide.

Grant's popularity earned her three acting nominations at the Erotic Film Awards in March, 1984. However, despite these accolades and her beauty, Grant had some difficulty getting work due to her cocaine addiction and lack of "enthusiasm" during sex scenes. In some circles she acquired the nickname "Applecoke" and gained a reputation for being flaky.

Retirement 
In 1983, Grant retired from the adult film industry after less than a year and just over 30 films and videos, in which she had sex on screen with 37 men, and after contracting herpes and having an abortion.

On March 14, 1984, she was a multiple nominee and presenter (with John Leslie) at the 8th Annual Adult Film Association Awards show at the Coconut Grove Ambassador Hotel. While her desire to act in mainstream films had generated no offers, she was so prestigious at the time that famed director Francis Ford Coppola was seated at her table.

At the awards show, Grant agreed to work on her first adult film in 10 months, Matinee Idol. The film was due to begin filming in eight days in San Francisco, California. A few days after the awards show, Marcell, her former boyfriend flew to Los Angeles to visit her, but Grant forgot about his arrival. Grant and Smith had partied and slept in the days following the awards show and lost track of time. At the same time Jake Ehrlich, another boyfriend and cocaine supplier for Grant, telephoned from prison informing her that their relationship was over and that Grant had to move out of his home in Palm Springs.

Grant persuaded her friend, veteran porn performer Kelly Nichols, to take over the role Grant had been offered in Matinee Idol. Grant also had the option of returning to Minnesota. Her parents offered to pay for her college expenses, but she believed she would no longer be comfortable at home in Minnesota.

Death 
On March 23, 1984, Grant died by suicide in Palm Springs by shooting herself with an AR-15 style .22 caliber rifle.

Grant's funeral was held on March 28, 1984, at St. Michael's Church, a Catholic parish near the center of Farmington, Minnesota. She was buried at the Saint Michaels Catholic Cemetery in Farmington.

Motion pictures
 Adult filmmaker Roberta Findlay made the controversial Shauna: Every Man's Fantasy (1985), about Grant's suicide.
 The television movie, Shattered Innocence (1988), starring Jonna Lee, was loosely based on  Grant's life. Her parents used their proceeds from selling the movie rights to pay for their daughter's tombstone.

Music
 The musician Klaus Flouride honored Grant in the song "Dancing with Shauna Grant", from his album The Light is Flickering (1991). The song also mentions Virginia and Suzie Superstar, both of which are films that Grant starred in.
 Pop-punk band J Church wrote a song about the life and suicide of Grant called "Girl In A Magazine", which appeared on their 7" This Song Is For Kathi (1992).
 Christian metal band Mastedon wrote a song called "Innocent Girl", in memory of Shauna Grant on their debut album It's a Jungle Out There! (1989). The lyrics were written by the former Kansas lead John Elefante and his brother Dino.
 American death metal band Ripping Corpse wrote a song for their album Dreaming with the Dead (1991) about Grant, entitled "Deeper Demons". The lyrics question why such a tragic fate befell "little Colleen".

Notable television appearances 
 Frontline: "Death of a Porn Queen" (June 8, 1987), as herself (archive footage; originally produced as a local special report for WCCO-TV in Minneapolis-St. Paul)
 Hard Copy: "Shauna Grant" (June 18, 1990), as herself (archive footage)

References

Further reading
 
 
 
  Reprinted from The Los Angeles Times.
 
 
 
  Reprinted from The Los Angeles Times.

External links
 
 
 

1963 births
1984 deaths
American female adult models
American pornographic film actresses
Pornographic film actors from California
Suicides by firearm in California
People from Bellflower, California
20th-century American actresses
People from Farmington, Minnesota
Burials in Minnesota
Female suicides
1984 suicides